Sir Michael James Lighthill  (23 January 1924 – 17 July 1998) was a British applied mathematician, known for his pioneering work in the field of aeroacoustics<ref>{{cite web |url=http://www.uh.edu/engines/epi2250.htm |title=Engines of Ingenuity No. 2250: Sir Michael James Lighthill by John H. Lienhard |access-date=28 July 2011}}</ref> and for writing the Lighthill report on artificial intelligence.

Biography

James Lighthill was born to Ernest Balzar Lichtenberg and Marjorie Holmes: an Alsatian mining engineer who changed his name to Lighthill in 1917, and the daughter of an engineer. The family lived in Paris until 1927, when the father retired and returned to live in England. As a young man, James Lighthill was known as Michael Lighthill.

Lighthill was educated at Winchester College, and graduated with a BA from Trinity College, Cambridge in 1943. He specialised in fluid dynamics, and worked at the National Physical Laboratory at Trinity. Between 1946 and 1959 he was Beyer Professor of Applied Mathematics at the University of Manchester. Lighthill then moved from Manchester to become director of the Royal Aircraft Establishment at Farnborough. There he worked on the development of television and communications satellites, and on the development of crewed spacecraft. This latter work was used in the development of the Concorde supersonic airliner.

In 1955, together with G. B. Whitham, Lighthill set out the first comprehensive theory of kinematic waves (an application of the method of characteristics), with a multitude of applications, prime among them fluid flow and traffic flow.

Lighthill's early work included two dimensional aerofoil theory, and supersonic flow around solids of revolution. In addition to the dynamics of gas at high speeds he studied shock and blast waves and introduced the squirmer model. He is credited with founding the subject of aeroacoustics, a subject vital to the reduction of noise in jet engines. Lighthill's eighth power law'' states that the acoustic power radiated by a jet engine is proportional to the eighth power of the jet speed. He also founded non-linear acoustics, and showed that the same non-linear differential equations could model both flood waves in rivers and traffic flow in highways.

In 1958, Lightill was elected to the American Academy of Arts and Sciences.

In 1964 he became the Royal Society's resident professor at Imperial College London, before returning to Trinity College, Cambridge, five years later as Lucasian Professor of Mathematics, a chair he held until 1979, when he was succeeded by Stephen Hawking. Lighthill then became Provost of University College London (UCL) – a post he held until 1989.

Lighthill founded the Institute of Mathematics and its Applications (IMA) in 1964, alongside Professor Sir Bryan Thwaites. In 1968, he was awarded an Honorary Degree (Doctor of Science) by the University of Bath. In 1972 he was invited to deliver the  MacMillan Memorial Lecture to the Institution of Engineers and Shipbuilders in Scotland. He chose the subject "Aquatic Animal Locomotion".

Lighthill was elected to the American Philosophical Society in 1970.

In the early 1970s, partly in reaction to significant internal discord within that field, the Science Research Council (SRC), as it was then known, asked Lighthill to compile a review of academic research in Artificial Intelligence. Lighthill's report, which was published in 1973 and became known as the "Lighthill report," was highly critical of basic research in foundational areas such as robotics and language processing, and "formed the basis for the decision by the British government to end support for AI research in all but two universities", starting what is sometimes referred to as the "AI winter".

In 1976, Lighthill was elected to the United States National Academy of Sciences.

In 1982, Lighthill and Alan B. Tayler were jointly awarded the first ever Gold Medal of the Institute of Mathematics and its Applications in recognition of their "outstanding contributions to mathematics and its applications over a period of years". In 1983 Lighthill was awarded the Ludwig Prandtl Ring from the Deutsche Gesellschaft für Luft- und Raumfahrt (German Society for Aeronautics and Astronautics) for "outstanding contribution in the field of aerospace engineering".

His hobby was open-water swimming.  He died in the water in 1998 when the mitral valve in his heart ruptured while he was swimming round the island of Sark, a feat which he had accomplished many times before.

Publications

See also
 James Lighthill House

External links 

 Lighthill Papers at University College London

References

Further reading 

1924 births
1998 deaths
Academics of Imperial College London
Academics of the Victoria University of Manchester
Alumni of Trinity College, Cambridge
20th-century British mathematicians
Donegall Lecturers of Mathematics at Trinity College Dublin
Fellows of the Royal Society
Fellows of Trinity College, Cambridge
Knights Bachelor
Lucasian Professors of Mathematics
Royal Medal winners
Recipients of the Copley Medal
Fluid dynamicists
Members of the French Academy of Sciences
Foreign associates of the National Academy of Sciences
Foreign Members of the Russian Academy of Sciences
Provosts of University College London
Ludwig-Prandtl-Ring recipients
People educated at Winchester College
Scientists of the National Physical Laboratory (United Kingdom)
Academics of University College London
Members of the American Philosophical Society